Majed Kilani (born 1 January 1997) is a Tunisian tennis player.

Career
Kilani has a career high ATP singles ranking of 800 achieved on 24 August 2020. He also has a career high ATP doubles ranking of 527, also achieved on 24 August 2020. Kilani has won 4 ITF doubles titles. 

Kilani had studied at University of Tulsa, between 2015-2019.

Kilani has represented Tunisia at Davis Cup. In Davis Cup he has a win-loss record of 4-0.

In June 2020, Kilani was banned from professional tennis for 7 years and fined $7,000 for match-fixing and associated corruption charges.

Future and Challenger finals

Doubles 7 (4–3)

Davis Cup

Participations: (4–0)

   indicates the outcome of the Davis Cup match followed by the score, date, place of event, the zonal classification and its phase, and the court surface.

References

External links

1997 births
Living people
Tunisian male tennis players
Tulsa Golden Hurricane men's tennis players
Match fixers
Match fixing in tennis
21st-century Tunisian people